Propylene oxide is an acutely toxic and carcinogenic organic compound with the molecular formula CH3CHCH2O. This colourless volatile liquid with an odour similar to ether, is produced on a large scale industrially. Its major application is its use for the production of polyether polyols for use in making polyurethane plastics. It is a chiral epoxide, although it is commonly used as a racemic mixture.

This compound is sometimes called 1,2-propylene oxide to distinguish it from its isomer 1,3-propylene oxide, better known as oxetane.

Production
Industrial production of propylene oxide starts from propylene. Two general approaches are employed, one involving hydrochlorination and the other involving oxidation.  In 2005, about half of the world production was through chlorohydrin technology and one half via oxidation routes.  The latter approach is growing in importance.

Hydrochlorination route
The traditional route proceeds via the conversion of propene to propylene chlorohydrin according to the following simplified scheme:

The mixture of 1-chloro-2-propanol and 2-chloro-1-propanol is then dehydrochlorinated. For example:

Lime (calcium hydroxide) is often used to absorb the HCl.

Oxidation of propylene
The other general route to propylene oxide involves oxidation of propylene with an organic peroxide. The reaction follows this stoichiometry:

CH3CH=CH2  +  RO2H  →   CH3CHCH2O  +  ROH

The process is practiced with four hydroperoxides:
In the Halcon process, t-Butyl hydroperoxide derived from oxygenation of isobutane, which affords t-butanol.  This coproduct can be dehydrated to isobutene, converted to MTBE, an additive for gasoline.
 Ethylbenzene hydroperoxide, derived from oxygenation of ethylbenzene, which affords 1-phenylethanol.  This coproduct can be dehydrated to give styrene, a useful monomer.
Cumene hydroperoxide derived from oxygenation of cumene (isopropylbenzene), which affords cumyl alcohol. Via dehydration and hydrogenation this coproduct can be recycled back to cumene.  This technology was commercialized by Sumitomo Chemical.
Hydrogen peroxide is the oxidant in the hydrogen peroxide to propylene oxide (HPPO) process, catalyzed by a titanium-doped silicalite:
C3H6 + H2O2 → C3H6O + H2O

In principle, this process produces only water was a side product.  In practice, some ring-opened derivatives of PO are generated.

Reactions 
Like other epoxides, PO undergoes ring-opening reactions.  With water, propylene glycol is produced.  With alcohols, reactions, called hydroxylpropylation, analogous to ethoxylation occur.  Grignard reagents add to propylene oxide to give secondary alcohols.

Some other reactions of propylene oxide include:
 Reaction with aluminium oxide at 250–260 °C leads to propionaldehyde and a little acetone.
 Reaction with silver(I) oxide leads to acetic acid.
 Reaction with sodium–mercury amalgam and water leads to isopropanol.

Uses
Between 60 and 70% of all propylene oxide is converted to polyether polyols by the process called alkoxylation.  These polyols are building blocks in the production of polyurethane plastics.  About 20% of propylene oxide is  hydrolyzed into propylene glycol, via a process which is accelerated by acid or base catalysis. Other major products are polypropylene glycol, propylene glycol ethers, and propylene carbonate.

Niche uses

Fumigant
The United States Food and Drug Administration has approved the use of propylene oxide to pasteurize raw almonds beginning on September 1, 2007, in response to two incidents of contamination by Salmonella in commercial orchards, one incident occurring in Canada and one in the United States.
Pistachio nuts can also be subjected to propylene oxide to control Salmonella.

Microscopy
Propylene oxide is commonly used in the preparation of biological samples for electron microscopy, to remove residual ethanol previously used for dehydration. In a typical procedure, the sample is first immersed in a mixture of equal volumes of ethanol and propylene oxide for 5 minutes, and then four times in pure oxide, 10 minutes each.

Munition
Propylene oxide is sometimes used in thermobaric munitions as the fuel in fuel–air explosives. In addition to the explosive damage from the blast wave, unexploded propylene oxide can cause additional effects from direct toxicity.

Safety
Propylene oxide is both acutely toxic and carcinogenic. Acute exposure causes respiratory tract irritation, eventually leading to death . Signs of toxicity after acute exposure include salivation, lacrimation, nasal discharge, gasping, lethargy and hypoactivity, weakness, and incoordination. Propylene oxide is also neurotoxic in rats, and presumably in humans 

Propyelene oxide alkylates DNA. As such, it is known animal carcinogen and a potential human carcinogen, and is included into the List of IARC Group 2B carcinogens.

Natural occurrence
In 2016 it was reported that propylene oxide was detected in Sagittarius B2, a cloud of gas in the Milky Way weighing three million solar masses.  It is the first chiral molecule to be detected in space, albeit with no enantiomeric excess.

References

Cited sources

External links 
 WebBook page for C3H6O
 Propylene oxide at the United States Environmental Protection Agency
 Propylene oxide – chemical product info: properties, production, applications.
 Propylene oxide at the Technology Transfer Network Air Toxics Web Site
 CDC – NIOSH Pocket Guide to Chemical Hazards

Epoxides
IARC Group 2B carcinogens
Commodity chemicals